Doyle Webb (born December 3, 1955) is an American politician who served as the Chair of the Arkansas Republican Party from 2008 to 2020. He currently serves as Chairman of the Arkansas Public Service Commission. During his tenure, Republicans gained control of all of Arkansas' constitutional offices, both chambers of the General Assembly, and both of the state's U.S. Senate seats. He previously served in the Arkansas Senate from the 14th district from 1995 to 2002.
In 2000, Mr. Webb was reprimanded for violating Arkansas Model Rules 7.5(d), 5.3(d), 8.4(a) and 1.10(a).

References

1955 births
2020 United States presidential electors
Arkansas Republican state chairmen
Republican Party Arkansas state senators
Living people